Rikard Andreasson (born 22 January 1979) is a Swedish cross-country skier who has competed since 2000. His best World Cup finish was second in the 4 × 10 km relay at Sweden in November 2008.

Cross-country skiing results
All results are sourced from the International Ski Federation (FIS).

World Cup

Season standings

Team podiums
 1 podium

References

External links

1979 births
Living people
Swedish male cross-country skiers
Place of birth missing (living people)